Rage (Tokarev in Europe) is a 2014 American action crime thriller film directed by Paco Cabezas and written by Jim Agnew and Sean Keller. The film stars Nicolas Cage, Rachel Nichols, Peter Stormare, Danny Glover, Max Ryan, Judd Lormand and Pasha D. Lychnikoff.

Plot
Paul Maguire and his buddies Kane and Danny live a life of crime. One night, they ambush a Russian mobster, intercepting him when he's on his way to drop off money to his boss. The take is much larger than they imagined; along with a Russian TT pistol, they get away with a briefcase full of cash. It's enough for Paul to leave the life of crime and go legit, but their crime sets off a bloody protracted war between their Irish crime family and the Russian mob. Paul instructs his friends to hide the money until things calm down between their outfit and the Russians. In spite of several casualties on both sides, their plan works well; five years after stealing the money, Paul, Kane and Danny meet to split up the take.

Over the next twenty years, Paul uses his share to slowly build a legitimate construction empire in Mobile, Alabama. He marries a beautiful, ambitious woman named Vanessa and is a doting father to his teenage daughter Caitlin. His former mob boss, O’Connell (who uses a wheelchair), has allowed him to go legit and stays on speaking terms, but he remains friends with his buddies Kane and Danny, who haven't had his luck when it comes to reforming. One night Paul and Vanessa are heading to a charity dinner, leaving Caitlin at home to hang out with her friends Evan and Mike. At the dinner, Mobile P.D. Detective St. John approaches Paul, who is used to being hassled for his former life of crime. But the detective isn't hassling him; something has happened to Caitlin.

Evan and Mike tell the police and Paul that they were watching TV with Caitlin, when several masked men barged in and took her. They fought – but the men overtook Mike and Evan. Convinced the kidnapping is long-overdue retaliation for the crimes of his youth – specifically his run-in with Ivan, Paul ignores the police and mounts his own investigation.

Paul's patience with the police ends completely when Caitlin's body is found in a storm drain. After her funeral, O'Connell strongly suggests that Paul allow the police to handle the investigation, reasoning that Paul was allowed to walk out of the mob, and therefore he should stay away from mob methods.

Paul and his buddies shake down and rough up anyone they can find who might be connected to Chernov, the legendary mob boss whose money they stole seventeen years earlier and who they think was involved in Caitlin's murder. O'Connell pleads with Paul to stop his rampage, but he refuses. Vanessa, who initially backed her husband's search, now fears he's becoming the killer he once was. But there exists another possibility: perhaps he has always been a violent man and can never truly leave that life behind.

After executing some of Chernov's men and wrecking their businesses, Paul's buddies are targeted by Chernov. When Kane is captured and tortured, he tries to get Chernov to admit to killing Caitlin as revenge for the heist decades ago. Chernov is perplexed, but also angry that Paul did the long-ago crime, as the Russian mobster they killed turns out to have been Chernov's brother. Meanwhile, Paul thinks Danny had to have talked because the friend is directly working for O'Connell once again, and Danny uses drugs and parties and may have talked and not remembered. He confronts Danny, accuses him of ratting, and kills him with a knife in a moment of wrath.

Chernov arranges a meet with O'Connell, explains Paul's part in starting the long-ago gang war, and demands O'Connell exact discipline. O'Connell refuses to listen to Chernov on general principles, and the resulting shootout leaves Chernov as the only survivor.

Paul finds a Tokarev pistol in his closet, a relic from the robbery that started the war years ago. He finally gets the real story from Mike; drinking and horsing around with his guns that night, Mike accidentally shot his daughter, then created the kidnapping story in a panic. After an inner struggle, Paul allows Mike to live and walks away. Returning home, Paul phones his wife, apologizing and saying things will be over soon, as Chernov and some of his surviving men enter his house. He then tells her the story about the first time he killed, when someone gave him a knife in a barfight. He stabs himself as he watches men entering the room with guns pointed at him. Suddenly, Paul is shot and killed. Vanessa reaches home only to witness policemen taking out Paul's body with teary eyes.

Cast
 Nicolas Cage as Paul Maguire
Weston Cage as Young Paul Maguire 
 Rachel Nichols as Vanessa
 Peter Stormare as Frances "Frank" O'Connell
 Danny Glover as Detective Peter St. John
 Max Ryan as Kane
Jon Dannelley as Young Kane
 Michael McGrady as Danny Doherty
 Judd Lormand as Mr. White
 Max Fowler as Mike
 Pasha D. Lychnikoff as Chernov
 Ron Goleman as Detective Hanson
 Aubrey Peeples as Caitlin Maguire
 Elena Sanchez as Lisa
 Garrison Tyler as Ivan
 Dawn Hamil as Amber
 Jack Falahee as Evan
 Kelly Tippens as Eleanor
 Kevin Lavell Young as Oliver
 Patrice Cols as Anton
 Steven Vickers Jr. as Jack
 Sarah Ann Schultz as Miss Russell
 Paul Sampson as Sasha
 Sam Velasquez as Tony Blanco
 Elisa García as Águeda Blanco

Production 
Filming began in June 2013 in Mobile, Alabama.

Reception 
Rage received negative reviews from critics. On Rotten Tomatoes, the film holds a rating of 14%, based on 37 reviews, with an average rating of 3/10. The site's consensus reads, "Depressingly dull and all-around poorly made, Rage is the rare Nicolas Cage action thriller lacking enough energy to reach 'so bad it's good' territory." On Metacritic, the film has a score of 28 out of 100, based on 17 critics, indicating "generally unfavorable reviews".

References

External links 
 
 

2010s English-language films
2014 films
Films set in Alabama
Films shot in Mobile, Alabama
2014 action thriller films
2014 crime thriller films
American action thriller films
American crime thriller films
Films directed by Paco Cabezas
2010s American films